The Valley of Fire Road (also called the Valley of Fire Highway) is a road in northeastern Clark County, Nevada serving the Valley of Fire State Park. The roadway was previously designated State Route 40 (SR 40), and the segment within the state park is currently designated a Nevada Scenic Byway.

Route description

From there, the two-lane highway travels southeasterly about  through open desert terrain towards the Muddy Mountains. The road begins to follow more a more hilly and curvaceous path as it meanders through the mountains. Beyond the fee station, Valley of Fire Road traverses the southern reaches of the state park, passing nearby to various campgrounds, trails, the visitor center, and other points of interest. The mountainous landscape adjoining the highway becomes much more colorful, reflective of the terrain featured in the park.

Payment of a state park entrance fee is required to travel on Valley of Fire Road between the west and east entrance stations. As of June 2021, the day use entrance fee is 10 per vehicle and 15 per non-Nevada vehicle.

History

A county road appearing in an approximately parallel alignment of the Valley of Fire Road appears on official state highway maps as early as 1933. However, the road proceeded much more easterly from U.S. Route 91 (US 91) and SR 6 at Crystal to connect to SR 12 near St. Thomas, bypassing north of the Valley of Fire. By 1941, SR 40 was moved to a new alignment that resembles the present-day alignment of the Valley of Fire Road—the new routing was an unimproved,  roadway traversing the southern side of the Valley of Fire State Park. The road was finally paved by 1964.

In 1976, the Nevada Department of Transportation (NDOT) began an effort to renumber its state highways. In this process, the SR 40 designation along Valley of Fire Road was proposed to be combined with SR 12 into a new State Route 169. This new highway designation was first seen on state highway maps in 1978. This action ultimately was not carried out, leaving the Valley of Fire Road without a state route number by 1982. However, as of 2020, the portion of Valley of Fire Road within the state park boundaries is still maintained by NDOT as a state park road.

A  section of the Valley of Fire Road—the portion between the west and east entrances to the state park—was designated a Nevada Scenic Byway on June 30, 1995.

Major intersections

See also

References

External links

Nevada Scenic Byways